Dinap (ΔΗΝΑΠ, D. Apostolopoulos O.E.) was one of the smaller Greek machine and truck manufacturers with its factory on Liosion St., in Athens. The Dinap 1200 was a three-wheel truck produced in the second half of the 1960s. It was powered by a 1200cc,  air-cooled Volkswagen engine and could legally carry . This load was higher than the equivalent for most other three-wheel trucks, but this made little difference since those vehicles were frequently loaded with up to 3 tons.

See also 
 Styl Kar (overview of the three-wheeler era in Greece)

References 
L.S. Skartsis and G.A. Avramidis, "Made in Greece", Typorama, Patras, Greece (2003)  (republished by the University of Patras Science Park, 2007).
L.S. Skartsis, "Greek Vehicle & Machine Manufacturers 1800 to present: A Pictorial History", Marathon (2012)  (eBook) 
 

Defunct motor vehicle manufacturers of Greece
Three-wheeled motor vehicles